Hekmatabad-e Pain (also Romanized as Ḩekmatābād-e Pā’īn; also known as Ḩekmatābād) is a village in Rayen Rural District, Rayen District, Kerman County, Kerman Province, Iran. At the 2006 census, its population was 19, in 6 families.

References 

Populated places in Kerman County